Neftegorsky District is an administrative and municipal district (raion), one of the twenty-seven in Samara Oblast, Russia. It is located in the southeastern central part of the oblast. Its administrative center is the town of Neftegorsk. Population: 34,478 (2010 Census);  The population of Neftegorsk accounts for 55.8% of the district's total population.

References

Notes

Sources

Districts of Samara Oblast